RLV9 can refer to:

 Reusable launch vehicle, the general concept of Reusable launch vehicles (to space) 
 Reusable Launch Vehicle program (NASA), a cancelled NASA program that included the X33 experimental craft
 RLV-TD, India's Reusable Launch Vehicle - Technology Demonstrator project
 Relevium Technologies Inc, Stock Symbol: RLV
 Restrained Life Viewer for Second Life
 Defence of the Reich, the World War II German Reichsluftverteidigung (RLV) defensive aerial campaign 
 RLV College of Music and Fine Arts, Kerala, India